A Night in Venice is a 1934 Hungarian comedy film directed by Géza von Cziffra and starring Gyula Csortos, Zsuzsa Simon and, Lici Balla.

The film's sets were designed by the art director Márton Vincze. It was shot at the Hunnia Studios in Budapest. A separate German version A Night in Venice was also produced.

Plot summary

Cast

References

External links
 

Hungarian comedy films
Films directed by Géza von Cziffra
1934 comedy films
Films set in Venice
Hungarian black-and-white films